Zelikovitch, Zelikovich,  Zelikowitz (Hebrew: 'זליקוביץ, Yiddish: זעליקאָוויטש, Polish: Zelikowicz), is a  Jewish-Ashkenazi common surname.
Zelikovich is derived from the personal name Zelig, 
which is the German translation of the biblical Hebrew male personal name Asher ("happy", 
"approved" or "blessed" in Hebrew).  The Russian suffix "-ovich" means "son of".

The surname may refer to:

 George (Getzel) Selikovitsch (Zelikovitch),  a Jewish egyptologist, writer, journalist and translator.
 Elimelekh Zelikovich, commander of the first instructors' course of the Hagana underground during the 1920s.
 Rubin Zelicovici (Zelikovitch, later: Reuven Rubin), Romanian-born Israeli painter and Israel's first ambassador to Romania.
 Antonina Viktorovna Makhina Dumcheva Zelikovich, Russian rower.
 Miriam Eshkol (née Zelikovich), Spouse of Israeli Prime Minister Levi Eshkol

See also 
 Zeljković
 Ashkenazi Jews
 Jewish surnames
 German Jews

Ashkenazi surnames
Surnames